Fer Mamla Gadbad Gadbad (Punjabi: ਫੇਰ ਮਾਮਲਾ ਗੜਬੜ ਗੜਬੜ) is a  Punjabi film scheduled for release. The film is to be released on 12 July 2013, starring Roshan Prince, Japji Khera and Bhanu Sri Mehra.‘FMGG’ is a romantic-comedy story revolving around an aspiring actor ‘Jassi’ (Roshan Prince) who dreams of making a movie and launch himself as a ‘hero’. So that he could get to marry his love of life ‘Roop’ (Bhanushree Mehra) and to fulfill his dreams, he starts doing immoral activities and makes quick-money by creating dramas.

During one such ‘drama’, he ends up breaking the marriage of ‘Geet’ (Japji Khaira) and incidentally marries her forcefully by the village community... And now he has "two" girls in his life...

Will he end up with his love or his unexpected life partner...

Cast
 Roshan Prince as Jassi
 Japji Khera as Geet
 Bhanu Sri Mehra as Roop
 B.N. Sharma as Pooja
 Shavinder Mahal as Mohan Singh (Jassi's father)
 Sunita Dhir as Jassi's mother
 Hobby Dhaliwal as Amar Singh 
 Rana Jang Bahadur
 Rana Ranbir as Rambo (Jassi's friend)
 Bhotu Shah
 Karamjit Anmol as Karma
 Jarnail Singh as Tota
 Nisha bano as Karmo
 Satish Kaul as Gill Sahib (Geet's father)

Soundtrack

Accolades
2014 PTC Punjabi Film Awards
Won
 PTC Punjabi Film Award for Best Performance In a Comic Role - B.N. Sharma
 PTC Punjabi Film Award for Best Music Director - Jaggi Singh
 PTC Punjabi Film Award for Best Playback Singer Male - Dil De Varke by Kamal Khan
Nominated
 PTC Punjabi Film Award for Best Film - PTC Motion Pictures
 PTC Punjabi Film Award for Best Actor - Roshan Prince
 PTC Punjabi Film Award for Best Actress - Japji Khaira
 PTC Punjabi Film Award for Best Supporting Actor - Rana Ranbir
 PTC Punjabi Film Award for Best Debut Female - Bhanu Sri Mehra
 PTC Punjabi Film Award for Best Popular Song of The Year - Dil De Varke by Kamal Khan
 PTC Punjabi Film Award for Best Lyricist - Dil De Varke by Jaggi Singh
 PTC Punjabi Film Award for Best Playback Singer Female - Lakk Gadvi Varga by Sonu Kakkar
 PTC Punjabi Film Award for Best Editor - Harpreet Singh
 PTC Punjabi Film Award for Best Background Score - Salil Amrute
 PTC Punjabi Film Award for Best Dialogues - Rana Ranbir & Naresh Sharma

References

External links
 
 Fer Mamla Gadbad Gadbad Review : Retrieved from CityAirNews.com
 Fer Mamla Gadbad Gadbad Review : Retrieved from PunjabiCinema.org
 
 Fer Mamla Gadbad Gadbad Official Website
 Fer Mamla Gadbad Gadbad Movie on Filmspunjabi.com
 Fer Mamla Gadbad Gadbad Trailer
 PTC Punjabi Foreys into film production
  on Fermamlagadbadgadbad.com
 Fer Mamla Gadbad Gadbad Movie Review on PunjwoodPlanet.com

T-Series (company) films
Punjabi-language Indian films
2010s Punjabi-language films